General elections were held in Bolivia on 1 December 1925, electing both a new President of the Republic.

Results

President

References

1925 12
Bolivia
Legislative election
1925 12